The Iranian Oil Bourse, International Oil Bourse, Iran Petroleum Exchange Kish Exchange or Oil Bourse in Kish (IOB; the official English language name is unclear) also known as Iran Crude Oil Exchange, is a commodity exchange, which opened its first phase on 17 February 2008.

It was created by cooperation between Iranian ministries, the Iran Mercantile Exchange and other state and private institutions in 2005. The history of Iran Mercantile Exchange and its links with the "international trading floor of crude oil and petrochemical products in the Kish Island" (IOB) have been published.

The IOB is intended as an oil bourse for petroleum, petrochemicals and gas in various currencies other than the United States dollar, primarily the euro and Iranian rial and a basket of other major (non-US) currencies. The geographical location is at the Persian Gulf island of Kish which is designated by Iran as a free trade zone.

During 2007, Iran asked its petroleum customers to pay in non US dollar currencies. By December 8, 2007, Iran reported to have converted all of its oil export payments to non-dollar currencies.
The Kish Bourse was officially opened in a videoconference ceremony on 17 February 2008, despite last minute disruptions to the internet services to the Persian Gulf regions. Currently the Kish Bourse is only trading in oil-derived products, generally those used as feedstock for the plastics and pharmaceutical industries. However, officially published statements by Iranian oil minister Gholam-Hossein Nozari indicate that the second phase, to establish trading in crude oil directly, which has been suggested might one day perhaps create a "Caspian Crude" benchmark price analogous to Brent Crude or WTI will only be started after the Bourse has demonstrated a reasonable period of trouble-free running.

Due to technical problems, the oil bourse never proceeded, and the plans were finally abandoned after a vote by the Iranian Parliament on 7 January 2020.

Background

The three current oil markers are all US dollar denominated: North America's West Texas Intermediate crude (WTI), North Sea Brent Crude, and the UAE Dubai Crude. The two major oil bourses are the New York Mercantile Exchange (NYMEX) in New York City, and the IntercontinentalExchange (ICE) in London and Atlanta. As the Oil Bourse in Kish is developed through successive stages, the plan is to establish a Petrobourse as a fourth oil market, denominated by the Iranian rial, the euro and other major currencies.

Iran sits on some of the largest oil and gas reserves in the world. The bourse will offer 40 kinds of oil products. Iran produces over 25 percent of the total output of petrochemical products in the Middle East. At least 30 domestic companies and 20 foreign firms are active in the oil and petrochemical industries on Kish Island.

Operations

At the time of the Oil Bourse's opening on Kish, the Director of the Kish Stock Exchange, Hossein Allahdadi, said that there "are no limitations imposed on transactions by foreign shareholders at the Oil Bourse in Kish".

As of 2009, the Oil Bourse was a spot market for petrochemical products mainly, with plans to introduce sharia-compliant futures contracts for crude oil and petrochemicals in the future, during the second phase. Trading takes place through licensed private brokers registered with the Securities and Exchange Organization of Iran. Any company, domestic or foreign, can list their products on the exchange for as long as they meet the listing criteria.

Global standards for Islamic derivatives were set in 2010. The “Hedging Master Agreement” provides a structure under which institutions can trade derivatives such as profit-rate and currency swaps.

Timeline
2000/2001 Chris Cook, the former Director of Compliance & Market Supervision at the International Petroleum Exchange became aware in the course of an IPE disciplinary case that IPE Brant Crude Oil contract market settlement prices were being routinely manipulated by major traders and investment banks. While his complaint to UK regulators of settlement price manipulation was dismissed by the appointed Commissioner on a technicality the routine nature of settlement price manipulation subsequently became common knowledge.

February 2001  Chris Cook and an Iranian colleague Mehdi Moslehi - an exchange trading technology consultant – agreed that Iran was well placed to provide the necessary liquidity to create a Middle Eastern Benchmark contract.

May 2001 Mehdi Moslehi subsequently met the Governor of Central Bank of Iran (CBI) – the late Mohsen Nurbakhsh - in London and suggested that Iran should initiate establishment of a new Middle Eastern Oil Benchmark price. Governor Nurbakhsh requested a formal outline proposal in the form of a letter which he undertook to convey to Iran's petroleum ministry.

25 June 2001 Mehdi Moslehi wrote to Dr Nurbakhsh above suggesting that Iran consider establishing a Middle East benchmark oil price.

2003 Iran’s oil ministry decided to establish a domestic oil bourse and Minister Zanganeh appointed, Dr Mohammad Javad Asemipour as the Executive Director of Oil, Gas, Petrochemical Products Exchange Project.

Dr Asemipour established a tender to select a contractor to undertake the project and as a result Wimpole Limited (Mehdi Moslehi and Chris Cook as directors) entered into a joint venture with Tehran Stock Exchange Services Company to lead what became known as the “Wimpole Consortium” which included leading technology providers and exchange expertise.

May 17, 2004 Mehdi Moslehi and Chris Cook presented the Wimpole Consortium oil exchange proposal in Tehran at the Central Bank of Iran and in June 2014 Dr Mohammad Javad Asemipour appointed Wimpole Consortium as the contractor to implement the oil bourse of Iran.

August 2004 Mehdi Moslehi presented the pre-feasibility study for development of Iran Oil Bourse to Wimpole's joint venture partner Tehran Stock Exchange Services Company and the pre-feasibility study report was passed to Dr Mohammad Javad Asemipour.

2005 The newly appointed project management used the above report to request a licence for trading of bourse from Iran’s Exchange Board and the new Exchange received a licence to trade in the free zone of Kish Island in the Persian Gulf. The building and trading platform were implemented in Kish Island of Iran.

The Iranian oil bourse, first reported in 2005, initially had a widely publicised opening date of March 20, 2006. which is the Iranian New Year, Nauroz. According to an April 2005 report, the Tehran Stock Exchange (TSE), the Wimpole Consortium and a private staff fund for retired petroleum workers were to form a consortium developing the exchange.

January 2006 Chris Cook of the Wimpole Consortium referred to delays in the process due to the election to the presidency of Mahmoud Ahmadinejad and subsequent difficulty in appointing a new oil minister acceptable both to the president and parliament.

February 2006 Wimpole consortium complained that their invoices which used to receive the trading license has not paid.

March 2006 the Petroleum Minister of Iran, Kazem Vaziri Hamaneh, announced that due to  "technical glitches", the Bourse launch was postponed, with no new date set. However, as of April 26 Iran had restarted its move to open the oil market, and Kazem announced the bourse was set to open the first week of May.

May 2006 Minister of Economic Affairs and Finance Davoud Danesh-Jafari said the Oil Ministry has a two-month deadline for presenting the Articles of Association of the Iranian Oil Bourse. Danesh-Jafari said that the euro had not yet been finalized as the legal tender of transactions in the oil bourse, and the final decision about that depends upon the Oil Ministry’s proposed IOB Articles of Association.

July 2006 a building has been purchased and the projected opening date was originally slated for September 2006. On  September 15, Oil Minister Kazem Vaziri-Hamaneh stated that all preparatory requirements had been arranged for launching the oil stock market in the country. However, the launch had still not occurred.

December 2006 Bloomberg cited two Iranian newspapers reporting Iran's Minister of Economy Davoud Danesh-Ja'fari Iran as wanting to cut US dollar based transactions to a minimum.

March 2007 The New York Times reported that China's state-run Zhuhai Zhenrong Trading, the biggest buyer of Iranian crude worldwide, began paying for its oil in euros late last year. Iranian officials have said for months that more than half the OPEC member's customers switched their payment currency away from the dollar as Tehran seeks to diversify its reserves, but news of the Zhenrong change is the first outside confirmation.  Japan has also announced that it would be willing to switch to Yen from US Dollars. Iran's central banker announced in March 2007 that Iran had cut its holding of U.S.-dollar assets to around 20% of its foreign reserves in response to U.S. hostility.

September 2007 Japan's Nippon Oil has agreed to buy Iranian oil using yen.

December 2007 Iran stops accepting U.S. dollars for oil.

January 2008 Iran's Finance Minister Davoud Danesh-Jafari told reporters that the bourse will be opened during the anniversary of the Islamic Revolution (February 1–11).

February 2008 On February 4, the Iranian Cabinet approved the creation of the oil bourse in two stages - first a raw oil exchange and secondly an oil byproducts exchange. The Ministry of Finance and Economics, the Oil Ministry, the Ministry of Foreign Affairs, and the Central Bank of Iran are required to create a workgroup to coordinate the project, and the Iran Commodities Bourse Company is given the task of carrying out the project. The communique from the Cabinet states that the "Ministry of Finance and Economics Affairs is required to take measures in making the petrochemical byproducts bourse operational by the end of February 2008."

31 December 2009 Orr Litchfield LLP the law firm who developed the contract agreement for the report sued two directors of Wimpole Ltd and recovered the unpaid their invoices from the directors of Wimpole Ltd personal assets.

Opening
February 17, 2008: The Iranian Oil Bourse was inaugurated in a video conference ceremony from the capital Tehran attended by ministers of oil, finance and economic affairs as well as chairman of Iran's Stock Exchange and a number of other officials and financial experts.
The transactions will be made in Iranian rial, yen, euro and other major currencies. The Iranian Oil Bourse will probably accept Russian ruble as well.
The first transaction of the IOB took place at 9:30 the following morning, when 2200 tonnes of low-density polyethylene (LD-PE), held in 100 tonne cases, were traded.

November 2008: According to Chairman of Board of Directors for Iranian Oil Bourse Mehdi Karbasian ever since the launch of the first phase of the bourse, transactions worth over $1.5 billion have been made on different oil and petrochemical products.

October 2009: IRNA reported that "National Petrochemical Company's Managing Director Adel Nejad-Salim said in the opening ceremony that all petrochemical products will be gradually offered on the market." In the first phase, only petrochemical products such as polyethylene and methanol were traded on a spot basasis and in Iranian Rial. However, with the completion of the second phase, crude and by-products of oil can also be traded on the exchange in both Iranian Rial and Euro.

November 2009: IME reported that "the international trading floor of crude oil and petrochemical products in the Kish Island was put into operation."

June 2011: Iran summarized the 3 phases of Kish Stock Exchange's opening roadmap

early June 2011: Iran started fuel oil transaction in Kish Oil Bourse : 35,000 tons at 621.35 dollar per ton and payment was made through Euro or Dirham accounts overseas.

July 2011: Third phase of Iran Crude Oil Exchange has been launched. A shipment of 600,000 barrels of heavy crude oil were offered at the Kish International Trading Floor on July 23, 2011 and were traded at USD 112.65 per barrel.

August 2011: A shipment of 500,000 barrels of heavy crude oil were offered at the Kish Commodity Exchange on 18 August 2011 and were traded at USD 105.49 per barrel and received payments in euro and dirham. The crude consignment was traded without any discount or additional premium.

March 20, 2012: The Iranian oil bourse will no longer trade oil in the US dollar but start trading oil in other currencies such as the euro, yen, yuan, rupee or a basket of currencies.

January 7, 2020 The planned Iranian oil bourse was cancelled.

Petrochemical Exporting Countries Forum (PECF)

Iran has proposed the creation of a Petrochemical Exporting Countries Forum (PECF) which aims at financial and technological cooperation among members, as well as product pricing and policy making in production issues.

2008 submarine cable disruption

It has been suggested that the 2008 submarine cable disruption was connected with the launch of Iranian oil bourse and that the internet connection of Iran was being targeted to stop the launch of Iranian oil bourse.

See also

 Iran Mercantile Exchange
 Petrodollar
 Petrodollar warfare

Notes

References

External links
 PetroTalk Portal for petro related Articles, Discussion, Links and more
 Iran oil bourse next week, Persian Journal, April 26, 2006
 Iran takes on west's control of oil trading, The Guardian
 The Real Reasons Why Iran is the Next Target: The Emerging Euro-denominated International Oil Marker
 Petrodollar Warfare: Dollars, Euros and the Upcoming Iranian Oil Bourse
 The Proposed Iranian Oil Bourse
 Trading oil in euros – does it matter? 
 Will the Iranian Oil Bourse Threaten the Dollar?
 The Iranian line in the sand
 Petrodollar or Petroeuro? A new source of global conflict
 Strange ideas about the Iranian oil bourse
 Iranian Oil Bourse opening IOB will open amid hurdles

Commodity exchanges in Iran
Petroleum in Iran
Monetary hegemony
Financial services companies established in 2008
Non-renewable resource companies established in 2008
2008 establishments in Iran